Cotadutide is an experimental drug for the treatment of type 2 diabetes mellitus. It lowers blood glucose levels by mimicking the human hormones glucagon-like peptide 1 and glucagon, which play a role in blood sugar regulation. The drug is a peptide that is injected under the skin.

Cotadutide is in Phase II clinical trials .

See also 
 Glucagon (medication)

References 

Glucagon-like peptide-1 receptor agonists
Peptides